The 2019 British Indoor Athletics Championships was the national indoor track and field competition for British athletes, held on 9 and 10 February 2019 at the Arena Birmingham in Birmingham, England. The event served as the team trials for the 2019 European Athletics Indoor Championships.

Holly Bradshaw set a championship record in the women's pole vault, with a clearance of 4.80 metres.

Medal summary

Men

Women

References 

British Indoor Championships
British Indoor Athletics Championships
Sports competitions in Birmingham, West Midlands
Athletics Indoor
Athletics competitions in England